North Dakota Highway 97 (ND 97) is a  east–west state highway in the U.S. state of North Dakota. ND 97's western terminus is at ND 41 south of Velva, and the eastern terminus is at U.S. Route 52 (US 52) west of Voltaire.

Major intersections

References

097
Transportation in McHenry County, North Dakota